Hood Politics may refer to:

Hood Politics, a series of mixtapes by Termanology
"Hood Politics", a song by Kendrick Lamar from the 2015 album To Pimp a Butterfly